Ooh, Aah & You (also known as Ooh & Aah) is a short-form children's series created by the Canadian puppeteer duo Jason Hopley and Jamie Shannon, who also created Nanalan' and Mr. Meaty. It was produced by Kick Start Productions. In the United States, the shorts premiered in July 2005 during the Playhouse Disney line up. Ooh and Aah are a pair of monkey puppets. On March 31, 2007, they became the official hosts of Playhouse Disney, replacing Clay. They introduced the various long format (22 minute) and short format (1-3 minute) shows that aired on the network.

It last aired on February 13, 2011, the day before Disney Junior debuted, meaning that the short programs and mascots were dropped. After the daily sign-off was presented for the last time on that day, the mascots were retired. The segments and short programs of the show were briefly available on Disney Junior's official website as part of its "Fan Favorites" week on the week of July 18, 2011.

Characters

 Ooh (voiced by Marty Stelnick) is Aah's older brother, the calm blue monkey who loves to read and listen to classical music.
 Aah (voiced by Jason Hopley) is Ooh's younger brother, the hyper red monkey who loves to dance, sing, and play.
 Raa (voiced by Teddy West) is the lion who is interested of loves nature.
 Giraffy (voiced by Scarlett Keeble) is the bespectacled, giraffe who loves reading and often serves as the voice of reason.
 Zee (voiced by Ynez Williams) is the zebra who has calm attitude and likes music and performing.
 Elephanty (voiced by William Barber) is the elephant who is a scientist
 Roland is Ooh's stuffed elephant.
 Dave is Aah's stuffed penguin.
 Eden is Raa's stuffed elephant.
 Zac is Giraffy's stuffed zebra.
 Tom is Zee's stuffed tiger.
 Liam is Elephanty's stuffed lion.
 Sheila is a butterfly who flutters around Ooh and Aah's room.

Voices
 United Kingdom, Canada and United States - Marty Stelnick and Jason Hopley provided the voices of Ooh and Aah respectively.
 Australia and New Zealand - In Australia and New Zealand, the voices of Ooh and Aah were provided by Sydney-based Comedian Simon Kennedy and Actor Matt Moore respectively.

Websites
 The first version begins with Ooh and Aah smiling. Aah grabs a banana and the bananas read, "Print and Color". Ooh grabs the pineapple's top and Rollind pops up. The pineapple reads, "Watch a Video". The female voice-over is heard in the US and the male voice-over is heard in the UK. The video clips are short. "Say Hello to Ooh and Aah" is used below the list.
 The second version is the same as the first version. The party hat has "Going Bananas" in it and Aah surprises it. The video clips are long.
 The third version consists of Ooh and Aah welcoming the website. "GAMES" replaces "Print and Color" and "ACTIVITIES" replaces "Watch a Video". There is a guitar with "MUSIC" in it and a book with "STORIES" in it. Games has Ooh and Aah's Coco-Nutty Bowling and Inspector Ooh: The Great Monkey Detective. Activities has Print and Color, Watch a Video and Ooh and Aah's Fetch-A-Fruit. Music has Going Bananas. Stories has Wish You Were Here. The new video clips are short.
 The fourth and final version was the same as the third version. A new game, Ooh and Aah's Costume Catch is used in the Games section and a new story, Ooh and Aah's What's in the Birthday Box? Storybook is used in the Stories section. Wish You Were Here is in the Activities section instead of the Stories section. The new video clips are long.

Episode list
 Happy Monkey (long format) -- original air date July 15, 2005
 Loud & Quiet (short format) -- original air date July 29, 2005
 Banana Power (short format) -- original air date August 12, 2005
 I Spy Bananas (short format) -- original air date August 30, 2005
 Halloween (long format) -- original air date September 13, 2005
 Ooh's Birthday (long format) -- original air date September 30, 2005
 Coconut Song (short format) -- original air date October 14, 2005
 Monkercise (short format) -- original air date November 4, 2005
 Monkey Dance (short format) -- original air date December 9, 2005
 Monkey See, Monkey Do (short format) -- original air date December 13, 2005
 Monkey in the Middle (short format) -- original air date January 20, 2006
 Twinkle Twinkle (long format) -- original air date January 27, 2006
 Banana Day (short format) -- original air date February 3, 2006
 Cowboy Day (long format) -- original air date February 10, 2006
 Penguins & Elephants (short format) -- original air date February 17, 2006
 Hide and Seek (short format) -- original air date March 10, 2006
 Valentine's Day (long format) -- original air date March 24, 2006
 Friendship Day (long format) -- original air date April 14, 2006
 Pretend Fleas (short format) -- original air date April 21, 2006
 Pirate Day (short format) -- original air date May 5, 2006
 Monkador (short format) -- Original Air Date June 3, 2006
 Best Friends Day (long format) -- Original Air Date June 8, 2006

External links
 Playhouse Disney UK: Ooh, Aah & You

References

2000s American children's television series
2010s American children's television series
2005 American television series debuts
2011 American television series endings
2000s Canadian children's television series
2010s Canadian children's television series
2005 Canadian television series debuts
2011 Canadian television series endings
2000s preschool education television series
2010s preschool education television series
American children's adventure television series
American preschool education television series
American television shows featuring puppetry
Canadian children's adventure television series
Canadian preschool education television series
Canadian television shows featuring puppetry
Disney Junior original programming
Television series by Disney
Television series about children
Television series about monkeys
Fictional duos